Stigmella trojana is a moth of the family Nepticulidae. It is found in northern Greece and Turkey.

The wingspan is 4.4–5 mm. Adults are on wing in June, July and October.

The larvae feed on Quercus trojana. They mine the leaves of their host plant. The mine consists of a gallery, which is identical to the mines of Stigmella zangherii and Stigmella szoecsiella.

External links
Fauna Europaea
bladmineerders.nl
The Quercus Feeding Stigmella Species Of The West Palaearctic: New Species, Key And Distribution (Lepidoptera: Nepticulidae)

Nepticulidae
Moths of Europe
Moths described in 1998